Morgan Joe Luttrell (born November 7, 1975) is an American politician, businessman, and military veteran serving as the U.S. representative for Texas's 8th congressional district since 2023.

Early life and education 
Born in Houston in 1975, Morgan Joe Luttrell has a twin brother, Marcus. He graduated from Willis High School. Luttrell earned a Bachelor of Science degree in psychology from Sam Houston State University and a Master of Science in applied cognition neuroscience from the University of Texas at Dallas. He also has an executive certificate in professional leadership development from Harvard Business School.

Early career 
Luttrell is an adjunct professor at Sam Houston State University, of which he is an alumnus. He also teaches law enforcement leadership.

In 2019, Luttrell founded Trexxler Energy Solutions. He is also the founder of Stronos Industries, which provides recyclable and biodegradable campaign signs.

Military service 
Luttrell served as a United States Navy SEAL. In 2007, he was commissioned as a special warfare officer. He served as a SEAL for 14 years until being medically discharged in 2014 for a severe traumatic brain injury and spinal cord injury he sustained in a helicopter crash in 2009.

Early political involvement 

From 2017 to 2019, Luttrell was a senior advisor to Secretary Rick Perry in the United States Department of Energy. At the Energy Department, Luttrell worked to keep U.S. energy industry globally competitive through the Artificial Intelligence and Technologies Office.

U.S. House of Representatives

Elections

2022 
In 2021, Luttrell filed to run as a Republican for Texas's 8th congressional district in the 2022 election to succeed retiring incumbent Kevin Brady.

During his campaign, Luttrell was supported by Perry, Congressman Dan Crenshaw (also a retired Navy SEAL), House Minority Leader Kevin McCarthy, Texas Lieutenant Governor Dan Patrick, the Congressional Leadership Fund, and the American Patriots PAC, which was founded by McCarthy allies. He garnered some notoriety from his brother Marcus, a veteran and the author of the memoir Lone Survivor. In total, there were 11 candidates in the Republican primary, but Luttrell and Christian Collins, a conservative activist, were identified as the primary contenders since they both received significant political endorsements. Collins was supported by U.S. Senator Ted Cruz, the House Freedom action fund, and avid Trump supporters such as Marjorie Taylor Greene and Madison Cawthorn. The Texas Tribune described the race as "a tense proxy war, with some of the best-known Republicans in Texas—and the country—split between two of the leading candidates." Luttrell has expressed support for Trump, but he did request and receive campaign funds from a political PAC run by Adam Kinzinger, a major critic of Trump. Luttrell and Collins ran on similar issues—securing the border, gun rights, and restricting abortion—but Collins attempted to portray himself as the more pro-Trump candidate, accusing Luttrell of "lining up with the establishment". Donald Trump did not make an endorsement in the race.

Luttrell won the Republican primary with 52.2% of the vote, avoiding a runoff with Collins, who placed second with 22%. The Democratic nominee in the general election was Laura Jones, the former Democratic Party chair of San Jacinto County.  Luttrell joined a lawsuit with several other congressional Republican candidates to remove Libertarian Party candidates, who are often perceived as threatening to Republican chances in tight elections, from the ballot. FiveThirtyEight rated Luttrell "very likely" to win the election. He was endorsed by the editorial board of the Houston Chronicle. On November 8, 2022, Luttrell defeated Jones in the general election.

Tenure 
Luttrell assumed office on January 3, 2023 and was officially sworn in following the election of Kevin McCarthy as Speaker of the House on January 7. Along with Joaquin Castro and Troy Nehls, Luttrell is one of three twins from Texas in the 118th United States Congress. Luttrell was assigned to the House Armed Services Committee, serving on the Subcommittee on Cyber, Innovative Technologies and Information Systems and the Subcommittee on Intelligence and Special Operations.

Caucus memberships 

 Republican Main Street Partnership

Electoral history

2022

Primary results

General election results

Personal life 
Luttrell and his wife Leslie have two sons. They live in Magnolia, Texas. Luttrell has said that he is a Christian.

Notes

References

External links
 Congressman Morgan Luttrell official U.S. House website
 Morgan Luttrell for Congress campaign website
 
 

|-

1975 births
Living people
Republican Party members of the United States House of Representatives from Texas
United States Navy officers
United States Navy SEALs personnel